The 2021 Billboard Music Awards were held on May 23, 2021, at the Microsoft Theater in Los Angeles, California. The ceremony was  broadcast live from NBC, and was hosted by Nick Jonas. Musical performers were announced during a series of social media posts.

Nominees for Top Hot 100 Artist, Top Latin Male Artist, and Top Rap Female Artist were announced on April 28, 2021. The full list of nominations was presented on April 29, 2021. The Weeknd received the most nominations on the ceremony, being nominated for sixteen awards, later going on to win the most awards of the ceremony with 10 awards.

Pink received the Billboard Icon Award, Trae tha Truth received the Change Maker Award, and Drake received the Artist of the Decade Award.

Background
Finalists and select winners of the 2021 Billboard Music Awards were based on Billboard charts and reports from March 21, 2020 to April 3, 2021. There are two fan-voted categories; Top Social Artist, and Top Collaboration. Due to the COVID-19 pandemic, no awards were given for any touring category, including Top Touring Artist. The ceremony was sponsored by Rockstar Energy Drink, Security Benefit, Hot Tools, and Xfinity.

Nick Jonas was announced as the host of the ceremony on April 30, 2021. P!nk was announced as the recipient of the Billboard Icon Award and the first confirmed performer on May 4, 2021. She is the youngest recipient of the award to date, and succeeded Garth Brooks, who won the award in 2020. The award was presented by Jon Bon Jovi. Trae tha Truth was announced as the second recipient of the Change Maker Award on May 13, 2021. The award was presented by Tina Knowles-Lawson. In addition, Billboard has partnered with Trae and his non-profit organization, Angels by Nature, to create the awards show's first-ever non-fungible token (NFT). The sales opened up during the weekend of the ceremony, and all proceeds were donated towards the organization.

Although country singer Morgan Wallen earned six nominations this year, Billboard Music Awards producers announced that Wallen was not invited to attend the ceremony, due to a video released earlier this year by TMZ of him using a racial slur while with his friends in Nashville. In a statement, the production company noted, "Since his recent conduct does not align with our core values, we will not be including him on the show in any capacity (performing, presenting, accepting)." The company also stated that Wallen's nominations were solely based on his Billboard charts performance.

Billboard's Top Artists of the 2010s Decade list was officially revealed on May 11, 2021. Drake ranked at number one, and was honored with the Artist of the Decade Award. Taylor Swift, who ranked at number two overall, is the top female artist of the 2010s decade.

Unlike the 2020 ceremony, which had no fans in attendance due to the COVID-19 pandemic, Dick Clark Productions allowed fully vaccinated attendees (meaning they would have had their final vaccine before May 6, 2021) to attend the ceremony. Attendees would be required to show their vaccination card before entering the venue, complete wellness screenings, have their temperature taken, sit in dedicated audience seating, and wear facial coverings at all times. There was an estimated 500–600 fans in attendance.

Performers 
On May 10, 2021, performers were announced on a daily basis, leading up to the ceremony, via social media.
{| class="wikitable plainrowheaders"
! scope="col"| Performer(s)
! scope="col"| Song(s)
|-
! scope="row"| DJ KhaledH.E.R.Migos
| "We Going Crazy"
|-
! scope="row"| Doja CatSZA
| "Kiss Me More"
|-
! scope="row"| Twenty One Pilots
| "Shy Away"
|-
! scope="row"| Alicia Keys
| Songs in A Minor Medley''':
 "Piano & I"
 "A Woman's Worth"
 "How Come You Don't Call Me"
 "Fallin'"
|-
! scope="row"| AJR
| "Bang!""Way Less Sad"
|-
! scope="row"| Pink
| "Cover Me in Sunshine""All I Know So Far"Medley:
 "Get the Party Started"
 "So What"
 "Blow Me (One Last Kiss)"
 "Who Knew"
 "Just Like a Pill"
 "Just Give Me a Reason"
|-
! scope="row"| Sounds of BlacknessAnn Nesby
| "Optimistic"
|-
! scope="row"| Karol G
| "Bichota""El Makinon"
|-
! scope="row"| BTS
| "Butter"
|-
! scope="row"| Bad Bunny
| "Te Deseo Lo Mejor"
|-
! scope="row"| Glass Animals
| "Heat Waves"
|-
! scope="row"| The Weeknd
| "Save Your Tears"
|-
! scope="row"| Duran Duran Graham Coxon
| "Notorious""Invisible""Hungry Like the Wolf"
|-
! scope="row"| Jonas BrothersMarshmello
| Closing Medley:"Leave Before You Love Me""Sucker""Only Human""Remember This""What a Man Gotta Do"
|}

 Presenters 
The full list of presenters was announced on May 21, 2021 via social media.

 Nick Jonas – host, introduced Doja Cat & SZA and Twenty One Pilots
 Lil Rel Howery – presented Top Hot 100 Artist
 Gabrielle Union – presented Top Selling Song
 Michelle Obama – introduced Alicia Keys
 Renée Elise Goldsberry – presented Top Country Female Artist
 Dixie D'Amelio – introduced AJR
 Lena Waithe – presented Top Latin Artist
 Jon Bon Jovi – presented Pink with the Icon Award
 Lil Baby and Nick Jonas – presented Top Hot 100 Song 
 Jimmy Jam and Terry Lewis – introduced Sounds of Blackness featuring Ann Nesby
 Swizz Beatz – presented Top Rap Song
 Tina Knowles – presented Trae tha Truth with the Change Maker Award and introduced Padma Lakshmi
 Padma Lakshmi – introduced BTS
 Drake's friends and family — presented Drake with the Artist of the Decade Award
 Chelsea Handler – presenting Top Rock Artist
 Kathryn Hahn – introduced Glass Animals
 Henry Golding – introduced the Weeknd
 Cynthia Erivo – presented Top Billboard 200 Album
 Priyanka Chopra – introduced Duran Duran
 Leslie Odom Jr. – presented Top Artist
 Kelsea Ballerini – introduced the Jonas Brothers and Marshmello

Winners and nominees
Select finalists for the 2021 Billboard Music Awards were announced on April 28, 2021. NBC's Today Show revealed the finalists for Top Hot 100 Artist live in the Pop Start segment. E!'s Daily Pop announced the finalists for Top Latin Male Artist live during their show. Access Hollywood announced the finalists for Top Rap Female Artist live during their show.

Finalists in all categories were announced during the first-ever Billboard Music Awards - The List Live, which was streamed on social media platforms on April 29, 2021. The show was hosted by Access Hollywoods Zuri Hall and comedian LaLa Milan. Finalists were presented by Finneas, Maggie Baird, Luis Fonsi, Jon Batiste, Tate McRae, Anitta, Bretman Rock, Brianne Howey, Antonia Gentry, Chris Sullivan, Jay Pharoah, Kandi Burruss, Kyle Richards, Leslie Jordan, Lisa Rinna, the New Voices Bay Area TIGQ Chorus, Nick DiGiovanni, Paris Hilton, Rob Gronkowski, Tanya Rad, Brad Goreski, Tika the Iggy, Tim Anderson, and Wisdom Kaye. The show also featured reactions from 24kGoldn, Gabby Barrett, and Seventeen. In addition, Hall and Milan discussed the award categories, key finalist chart achievements and records.

Voting for Top Social Artist and Top Collaboration opened on Billboard's official website and on social media on May 10, 2021, and closed on May 21, 2021 at 11:59 p.m. PST.

On the day of the ceremony, Love Island'' narrator and co-writer Matthew Hoffman hosted an Instagram live on the ceremonies' official account at 10 a.m. PST, where he will announce the winners in categories that will not be aired during the main show.

Winners are listed first and in bold.

References

2021 in Los Angeles
2021 awards in the United States
2021 in American music
2021 music awards
Billboard awards
Billboard Music Award
May 2021 events in the United States
Impact of the COVID-19 pandemic on the music industry
Impact of the COVID-19 pandemic on television